A flan, in British cuisine, is an egg-based dish with an open, rimmed pastry or sponge base containing a sweet or savoury filling. Examples are bacon and egg flan and custard tart.

History 

Flan is known in Roman cuisine. It was often a savory dish, as in "eel flan"; sweet flans were also enjoyed.

In the Middle Ages, both sweet and savory flans (almonds, cinnamon and sugar; cheese, curd, spinach, fish) were very popular in Europe, especially during Lent, when meat was forbidden.

Etymology

The English word "flan", and the earlier forms "flaune" and "flawn", come from the Old French flaon (modern French flan), in turn from the early Medieval Latin fladō (accusative fladōnem), of Germanic origin, from an Indo-European root meaning "flat" or "broad".

See also

 Flan cake
 Flaó
 List of pies, tarts and flans
 Quiche

References

British desserts
Pies